Edward Barnes Leisenring Jr. (pronounced LYES-en-ring) (January 25, 1926 – March 2, 2011) was president of the Westmoreland Coal Company from 1961 to 1988 and chairman of the board from 1988 to 1998.

Biography
He was born on January 25, 1926, to Edward Barnes Leisenring Sr. in Bryn Mawr, Pennsylvania. In 1951 he married  Julia du Pont Bissell and they had three children: Erica Leisenring, Edward W. Leisenring and John Leisenring. In 1978, he ignored pleas from President Jimmy Carter, while leading industry negotiators during a bitter 100-day mine workers’ strike.  Ultimately he helped win a settlement that largely favored mine owners.  He had long been a national spokesman for mine owners. He died of heart failure on March 2, 2011, at his winter home in Aiken, S.C

References

External links
E.B. Leisenring Jr. papers at Hagley Museum and Library

People from Bryn Mawr, Pennsylvania
2011 deaths
1926 births
American business executives